The U.S. Men's Clay Court Championships is an annual ATP Tour tennis tournament that started in 1910. It is the last remaining ATP World Tour-level tournament in the United States to be played on clay courts.

The tournament began in 1910 when the Western Lawn Tennis Association (a section of the United States Lawn Tennis Association now known as the USTA/Midwest) lobbied the USLTA that a National Clay Court Championship would help promote the establishment of more clay courts in the West. Clay courts were more economical to install and maintain than grass courts, and the hope was that the lower costs associated with court construction would allow for a more rapid expansion of the game. The first National Clay Court Championships were held at the Omaha Field Club with a crowd of 5,000 watching the finals. Participation and play on clay grew as a result of the event and others, and in 1914 the event was moved to the Cincinnati Tennis Club. It has since been played in numerous cities, with long stints in River Forest and Indianapolis, and is today held in Houston, Texas. Between 1970 and 1989 it was part of the Grand Prix Tennis Tour as part of the Grand Prix Super Series of events (1974–1977). During the stint in Indianapolis from 1969 through 1986 the tournament was a combined men's and women's event.

Relocation 
The event was held at the Houston Westside Tennis Club from 2001–07. In May 2007, the U.S. Tennis Association announced that the River Oaks Country Club in the River Oaks neighborhood would host the tournament starting in 2008, keeping the event in Houston for several years. Other cities that competed for the event were Atlanta, Georgia, Winston-Salem, North Carolina, and Ponte Vedra Beach, Florida. The tournament pays out US$474,000 with the winner receiving US$85,900. The River Oaks venue features a stadium with seating for 3,000 with temporary seating for 500 for the second court.

In 2007, after a few years being held on the same red clay used at the French Open, the event was held on Har-Tru green clay. In 2008, the event went to a maroon color of Har-Tru clay as the River Oaks Country Club renovated their courts in 2005. After renovating their courts again in late 2008, the surface remained the same.

Past finals

Singles
Bill Tilden holds the record for most titles (7).
Bill Tilden and Frank Parker co-hold the record of most finals (8).

Doubles (open era)

Records

Men's singles
Source: The Tennisbase included
Most titles:  Bill Tilden, (7) 
Most consecutive titles:  Bill Tilden, (6) 
Most finals:  Bill Tilden, (8) 
Most consecutive finals:  Bill Tilden, (6)
Most matches played:  Tut Bartzen, (64)
Most matches won:  Frank Parker, (56)
Most consecutive match wins:  Bill Tilden, (36)
Most editions played:  Seymour Greenberg and  Grant Golden, (16)
Best Match winning %: Bill Tilden (97.96%)
Longest final:  Seymour Greenberg v  Harris Everett, result: 5–7, 7–5, 7–9, 7–5 (66 games), (1942)
Shortest final:  Magnus Norman v  Guillermo Cañas, result: 6–0, 6–3 (15 games), (1999)
Title with the least games lost:  Andre Agassi, (23), (2003)
Oldest champion:  Samuel Hardy, 40y 7m and 18d, (1917)
Youngest champion:  Frank Parker, 17y 5m and 3d, (1933)

See also

 Charleston Open – WTA clay court event held in the United States
 U.S. Women's Clay Court Championships
 River Oaks International Tennis Tournament

References

Sources 
 References used for the Pre-Open Era locations and champions: United States Lawn Tennis Association Yearbook (1942–'44, '48–49, '51, '53. '55–56, '60, '64, '66 & '69), Spalding Lawn Tennis Annual (1916, '24–'28, '30–'31 & '39), Wright & Ditson's Lawn Tennis Annual (1911–'14, 1921, 1932–'33, '35 & '37), New York Times articles (1910–'14, '16, '18–'19 & '21–'22), From Club Court to Center Court by Phillip S. Smith (2007 Edition, page 67).

External links 

 
 Association of Tennis Professionals (ATP) tournament profile
 Video of 1958 tournament in River Forest, IL

 
Tennis tournaments in the United States
Clay court tennis tournaments
Sports in Houston
Recurring sporting events established in 1910